The Witch Affair (Cosa de brujas) is a 2003 Spanish film written by Amalio Cuevas and Agustín Póveda, and directed by José Miguel Juárez.

Plot summary

The night of San Juan, Miguel murders his associate. Two elderly people are witness to the crime and predict that all of his dreams will come true thereafter. He will know the price he has to pay when he sees a black cat with a moon shaped mark on its forehead. Twenty-two years later a messenger begins to see all his dreams come true...

Cast
José Sancho - Miguel Gironza
Manuela Arcuri - Maria
Antonio Hortelano - Serafin
Alberto San Juan - Ángel
Manuel Manquiña - Rafael

Trivia

The film's composer, Mario de Benito, was nominated for a 2004 Goya for Best Original Song.
Filming dates: 20 March 2002 - 28 May 2002
Opening Weekend Gross: €272,606 (Spain) (19 January 2003) (180 Screens)
Second Weekend Gross: €122,127 (Spain) (26 January 2003)

External links
 

2003 films
Spanish horror films
2003 psychological thriller films
Films set in 1982
2000s Spanish-language films
2000s Spanish films